EJP may refer to:

Scholarly journals 
 Electronic Journal of Probability
 European Journal of Personality
 European Journal of Philosophy
 European Journal of Physics
 European Journal of Pharmacology

Other uses 
 United National Party, a political party in Sri Lanka
 European Jewish Parliament, a non-governmental organization
Eurojackpot, transnational European lottery